Matt Simms may refer to:

Matt Simms (American football), American quarterback
Matt Simms (musician), guitarist with Wire